Arctia festiva, the hebe tiger moth, is a moth species of the family Erebidae. Some authors have separated it in a monotypic genus Eucharia.
It is found in Central and Southern Europe, Near East, Iran, Central Asia, European Russia, Southern Siberia, Mongolia and China.

The adults of this species display polymorphism; in addition, several subspecies are recognized. The wingspan is 45–60 mm. The moth flies February to July depending on the location, mainly in spring.

The caterpillar feeds on a wide range of plants.

External links

Natural History Museum Lepidoptera generic names catalog
Fauna Europaea
Moths and Butterflies of Europe and North Africa
Lepiforum.de
Vlindernet.nl 

Arctiina
Moths of Europe
Moths of Asia
Moths described in 1766
Taxa named by Johann Siegfried Hufnagel